Saint Patrick's College is a Roman Catholic all-male secondary school. Located in County Cavan, Ireland. It was founded in 1871 as a minor and major seminary for the Diocese of Kilmore. It was officially opened by the Bishop of Kilmore, Dr Nicholas Conaty in 1874 for the Diocese of Kilmore, replacing St Augustine's Seminary (Kilmore Academy) established by Dr James Browne in 1839.

Kilmore Academy had both clerical and non-clerical students, over 100 clerical students went on to Maynooth College to be priests.

It was a day and boarding school, ceasing in 1998 as a boarding school. The Kilmore Diocese Pastoral Centre, opened in 2005, is based in the old boarding school wing. 2010 saw planning permission given for a new school building reportedly estimated to cost €8.6 million, which the school took possession of in summer 2012.

Subjects
The school offers leaving certificate subjects such as Irish, English, French, German, Mathematics, Physics, Chemistry, Physics & Chemistry,  Biology, Agricultural Science, Computer Studies, Accounting, Economics, Business, History, Geography, Art, Construction Studies, Music, Technical Drawing, as well as Career Guidance, P.E., and Religion.

The schools Junior Cert cycle includes Irish, English
French, German, Computer Studies, Mathematics, Science, Business Studies, Home Economics, History, Geography, Art, Materials Technology, Music, Technical Graphics, as well as Civil, Social and Political Education, Religion and P.E.

Sport

The school has won the Ulster MacRory Cup on twelve occasions, firstly in 1935, in Gaelic football. In 1972, it went on to win the all-ireland schools Hogan Cup. Hurling and soccer are also played as well as, more recently, chess and golf.

Presidents/Principals
Dr Liam McNiffe announced his retirement in 2012 and was replaced by Mr Christopher Rowley in August 2013. Previous Presidents/Principals of the College have included, Rev James Dolan, Rev Colm Hurley, Rev Dan Gallogly, Rev. John McTiernan and Rev Gerard Alwill (1997-2003). Mr Patsy Lee (2003-2008) was the first lay principal of the college.

Past pupils

 Seán Brady, cardinal, who was a student at St Patrick's returned as a professor to the college.
 Francis Joseph MacKiernan, bishop
 Philip Leo O'Reilly, bishop
 Francis Duffy, bishop
 T. P. McKenna, actor
 Myles Dungan, broadcaster
 Seán Gallagher, broadcaster
 Joe O'Reilly, politician
 John Joe O'Reilly, footballer
 Justin McKenna, politician

References

'Pounding Praying Playing: A Personal Account of Boarding School in St. Pat's Cavan' by Liam McNiffe

'I'm Not One to Gossip, But...' by John McEntee

Boys' schools in the Republic of Ireland
Buildings and structures in County Cavan
Cavan (town)